Several steamships have borne the name Ajax:

 was one of the first steamships that were fuel efficient enough to trade between the UK and China.
 was a Danish cargo ship sunk by a German U-boat in 1917.
 was a Norwegian cargo ship sunk by a German U-boat in 1917.
 was a Dutch cargo ship sunk by German bombers in 1940.

See also
 

Ship names